Whitaker's Mill Archeological Complex, also known as Burwell's Mill, is the site of an early colonial mill complex in York County near Williamsburg.  Located on the historic King's Creek Plantation near Route 199 and Water Country Parkway, the site has industrial remains of millworks from the 17th and 18th centuries, as well as military encampment sites associated with the American Revolutionary War and the American Civil War.

The site was listed on the National Register of Historic Places in 2008.

See also
National Register of Historic Places listings in York County, Virginia

References

Archaeological sites on the National Register of Historic Places in Virginia
Grinding mills in Virginia
Historic districts on the National Register of Historic Places in Virginia
National Register of Historic Places in York County, Virginia
1862 establishments in Virginia